Metoecus is a genus of wedge-shaped beetles in the family Ripiphoridae. There are at least five described species in Metoecus.

Species
These five species belong to the genus Metoecus:
Metoecus javanus (Pic, 1913)
Metoecus morawitzi 
Metoecus paradoxus (Linnaeus, 1761)
Metoecus satanus (Schilder, 1924)
Metoecus vespae (Kôno, 1927)

References

Ripiphoridae
Tenebrionoidea genera